The 2011–12 AZ Alkmaar season was the club's 45th season of existence, and their 14th season in the Eredivisie, the top-flight of Dutch football.

Club

First team
As of 1 August 2011

Competitions

Eredivisie

League table

Matches

KNVB Cup

UEFA Europa League

Qualification rounds
Third qualifying round

Play-off round

Group stage
Group G Standings

Match reports

Knock-out round

Round of 32

Round of 16

Quarter-finals

Transfers

References

AZ Alkmaar seasons
AZ
AZ